Hypsotropa rhodochroella is a species of snout moth in the genus Hypsotropa. It was described by George Hampson in 1918 and is known from Uganda and South Africa.

References

Moths described in 1918
Taxa named by George Hampson
Anerastiini